Help Me Help You may refer to:
Help Me Help You (TV series), 2006
"Help Me Help You" (song), 2017